Dead Swans is an English hardcore punk band from Brighton, formed in 2006. They released one album entitled Sleepwalkers in 2009, as well as three EPs; Southern Blue (2008), It's Starting, (2009), and Anxiety and Everything Else (2012). They also released a split EP with metalcore band Architects in 2008.

History

They were nominated in the Best British Newcomer category at the 2008 Kerrang! Awards.

On 11 January 2016, the band posted a short video clip via their Facebook account with the caption "2016...announcement soon", hinting at a potential reunion.

The band performed at the 2016 edition of Outbreak Festival at Canal Mills.

Discography

Music videos
"Keep Them Shut" (Anxiety And Everything Else EP, 2012)

Members
Current
 Nicholas Worthington - vocals (2006–2013, 2016–present)
 Stewart "Pid" Payne - guitar (2006–2013, 2016–present)
 Benjamin Marco - bass (2006–2013, 2016–present)
 Joey Bayes - guitar (2009–2013, 2016–present)
 Benny Mead - drums (2006–2011, 2016–present)

Past
 Robbie Taylor – guitar (2009)
 Craig Reynolds – drums (2011–2013)

References

External links
 Dead Swans on Bridge 9 Records

Musical groups established in 2006
Musical groups from Brighton and Hove
British hardcore punk groups
Musical quintets
Bridge 9 Records artists